Moriosomus is a genus of beetles in the family Carabidae, containing the following species:
 Moriosomus seticollis Straneo, 1985
 Moriosomus sylvestris Motschulsky, 1855

References

Pterostichinae